Rockcastle County is a county located in the southeastern part of the U.S. state of Kentucky. As of the 2020 census, the population was 16,037.  Its county seat is Mt. Vernon. The county was founded in 1810 and named for the Rockcastle River, which runs through it. The river, in turn, is named for its majestic rock cliffs. Rockcastle County is part of the Richmond–Berea, KY Micropolitan Statistical Area, which is also included in the Lexington-Fayette-Richmond-Frankfort, KY Combined Statistical Area.

Geography

Adjacent counties

National protected area
 Daniel Boone National Forest (part)

Demographics

As of the census of 2000, there were 16,582 people, 6,544 households, and 4,764 families residing in the county. The racial makeup of the county was 98.81% White, 0.14% Black or African American, 0.24% Native American, 0.13% Asian, 0.01% Pacific Islander, 0.04% from other races, and 0.63% from two or more races.  0.62% of the population were Hispanic or Latino of any race.

There were 6,544 households, out of which 33.60% had children under the age of 18 living with them, 57.90% were married couples living together, 11.40% had a female householder with no husband present, and 27.20% were non-families. 24.40% of all households were made up of individuals, and 10.70% had someone living alone who was 65 years of age or older.  The average household size was 2.49 and the average family size was 2.95.

In the county, the population was spread out, with 24.40% under the age of 18, 8.80% from 18 to 24, 30.00% from 25 to 44, 23.60% from 45 to 64, and 13.20% who were 65 years of age or older.  The median age was 36 years. For every 100 females there were 97.90 males.  For every 100 females age 18 and over there were 94.60 males.

The median income for a household in the county was $23,475 and the median income for a family was $30,278. Males had a median income of $26,770 versus $18,388 for females. The per capita income for the county was $12,337.  About 19.10% of families and 23.10% of the population were below the poverty line, including 28.30% of those under age 18 and 21.60% of those age 65 or over.

Politics
Rockcastle County has been a Republican stronghold since its founding. It has only voted for the Democratic presidential nominee four times, in 1868, 1872, 1876, and 1880. It has also never voted for a Democratic candidate from the county's founding in 1810 until 1868.

Communities
 Brodhead
 Livingston
 Mount Vernon (county seat)

See also

 National Register of Historic Places listings in Rockcastle County, Kentucky
 Rockcastle Regional Hospital and Respiratory Care Center
 Goochland Cave

References

External links

 
 The Kentucky Highlands Project

 
1810 establishments in Kentucky
Counties of Appalachia
Kentucky counties
Populated places established in 1810
Richmond–Berea micropolitan area